Buffalo Bulls basketball may refer to either of the basketball teams that represent the University at Buffalo:
Buffalo Bulls men's basketball
Buffalo Bulls women's basketball